Henry William Scriven (born 30 August 1951) is an English Anglican bishop who has served in Europe and in America.

Biography 
Scriven was educated at Repton School in Derbyshire and later at the University of Sheffield. He then studied at St John's College, Nottingham.  He was ordained in 1975 and served for four years in the Diocese of London followed by two years in the Diocese of Northern Argentina for the South American Missionary Society (SAMS).

With the onset of the Falklands War, Scriven and his family moved to Little Rock, Arkansas where he served Christ Episcopal Church, Little Rock as Assistant Rector for Education from 1982 to 1983.

From 1984 to 1990, Scriven continued with SAMS in Spain in the Spanish Reformed Episcopal Church. He then served for five years as chaplain for the British Embassy Church in Madrid in the Diocese of Gibraltar in Europe of the Church of England.  On 8 March 1995, he was consecrated as bishop by George Carey, Archbishop of Canterbury, as Suffragan Bishop in Europe. He was also commissioned by Edmond Browning as an assistant bishop to the Convocation of American Churches in Europe in May 1995.

From 2002 to 2008, Scriven served the Diocese of Pittsburgh as assistant bishop.  He is married to Catherine and has a daughter, Anna, and a son, Joel.

Scriven is great-great-grandnephew of Joseph Scriven, Irish poet, best known as the writer of the poem which became the hymn "What a Friend We Have in Jesus".

Consecrators
George Carey, Archbishop of Canterbury
Scriven was the 980th bishop consecrated or (as in his case) received into the Episcopal Church in the United States of America.

References

External links
 Scriven's webpage on the Diocese of Pittsburgh's website

1951 births
Living people
English people of Irish descent
Alumni of the University of Sheffield
Anglican suffragan bishops in Europe
People educated at Repton School
Episcopal bishops of Pittsburgh